The team sport of Cricket became a medal sport at the 2010 South Asian Games. Since then cricket has been contested at the South Asian Games on two occasions:
Cricket at the 2010 South Asian Games - hosts Bangladesh, beat Sri Lanka in a men's under 21 Twenty20 competition.
Cricket at the 2019 South Asian Games - Bangladesh beat Sri Lanka in both men's and women's Twenty20 competitions held in Nepal.

Summary

Men

Women

Medal table

Participating nations
Legend
GS — Group Stage

Men

Women

External links
SAG
OC Asia

 
Sports at the South Asian Games
Asian Games
South Asian Games